Sergeant Charles Stuart Fall (November 12, 1840 – June 4, 1918) was an American soldier who fought in the American Civil War. Fall received the country's highest award for bravery during combat, the Medal of Honor, for his action during the Battle of Spotsylvania Court House in Virginia on 12 May 1864. He was honored with the award on 13 May 1899.

Biography
Fall was born in Noble County, Indiana on 12 November 1840. He enlisted into the 26th Michigan Infantry. He died on 4 June 1918 and his remains are interred at the Odd Fellows Cemetery in California.

Medal of Honor citation

See also

List of American Civil War Medal of Honor recipients: A–F

References

1840 births
1918 deaths
People of Michigan in the American Civil War
Union Army officers
United States Army Medal of Honor recipients
American Civil War recipients of the Medal of Honor